Omorgus rodriguezae is a species of hide beetle in the subfamily Omorginae.

References

rodriguezae
Beetles described in 2005